František Čermák and Michal Mertiňák unsuccessfully defended their title, after lost to Leoš Friedl and Filip Polášek in the final 3–6, 6–7(7–9).

Seeds

Draw

Draw

References
 Doubles Draw

Doubles